Sokyryntsi  (also Sokyrynci) is a village located at the Zbruch River in Chortkiv Raion (district) of Ternopil Oblast (province in western Ukraine). 
Local government — Sokyrynetska village council. It belongs to Husiatyn settlement hromada, one of the hromadas of Ukraine.

The first mention of Sokyryntsi dates from the year 1493. The Archeological sights from  Trypillian and Chernyakhov culture were found near the village.

References

External links 
 weather.in.ua
 village Sokyryntsi

Literature 
 History of Towns and Villages of the Ukrainian SSR, Lvov region. — К. : ГРУРЕ, 1968 р.  
 
  Holos narodu N 34 (8318), August 24, 2011. “My kraplyny yedynoyi riky”  
 Sabine von Löwis. "Phantom borders and ambivalent spaces of identification in Ukraine". L'Espace géographique, Volume 46(2), 2017.

Villages in Chortkiv Raion